Acteocina is a genus of very small sea snails, bubble snails, marine opisthobranch gastropod mollusks in the family Tornatinidae, the canoe bubbles or chalice bubble snails.

Species
Species within the genus Acteocina include:

 Acteocina androyensis (Bozzetti, 2009)
 Acteocina apicina (Gould, 1859)
 Acteocina apiculata (Tate, 1879)
 Acteocina atrata (Mikkelsen & Mikkelsen, 1984)
 Acteocina bermudensis (Vanatta, 1901)
 Acteocina bullata (Kiener, 1834)
 Acteocina canaliculata (Say, 1826)
 Acteocina candei (d’Orbigny, 1841)
 Acteocina capitata (Pilsbry, 1895)
 Acteocina carinata (Carpenter, 1857)
 Acteocina cerealis (Gould, 1853)
 Acteocina conspicua (Preston, 1908)
 Acteocina crithodes (Melville & Standen, 1907)
 Acteocina culcitella (Gould, 1853)
 Acteocina decorata (Pilsbry, 1904)
 Acteocina decurrens (Verrill & Bush, 1900)
 Acteocina estriata (Preston, 1914)
 Acteocina eumicra (Crosse, 1865)
 Acteocina excerta (Hedley, 1903)
 Acteocina exilis (Dunker, 1860)
 Acteocina eximia (Baird, 1863)
 Acteocina fusiformis (A. Adams, 1854)
 Acteocina gordonis (Yokoyama, 1927)
 Acteocina gracilis (A. Adams, 1850)
 Acteocina hadfieldi (Melvill & Standen, 1896)
 Acteocina harpa (Dall, 1871)
 Acteocina inconspicua (H. Adams, 1872) 
 Acteocina inculta (Gould & Carpenter, 1857)
 Acteocina infrequens (C. B. Adams, 1852)
 Acteocina interrogens (Serge Gofas, Ángel A. Luque, Joan Daniel Oliver, José Templado & Alberto Serra, 2021)
 Acteocina involuta (G. Nevill & H. Nevill, 1871)
 Acteocina isselii (Pilsbry, 1893)
 Acteocina kesenensis (Nomura & Hatai, 1935)
 Acteocina knockeri (E. A. Smith, 1871)
 Acteocina kristenseni (De Jong & Coomans, 1988)
 † Acteocina lajonkaireana (Basterot, 1825) 
 Acteocina lata (Valdés, 2008)
 Acteocina lepta (Woodring, 1928)
 Acteocina liratispira (E. A. Smith, 1872)
 Acteocina mucronata (Philippi, 1849)
 Acteocina nanshaensis (Lin, 1991)
 Acteocina nitens (Thiele, 1925)
 Acteocina oldroydi (Dall, 1925)
 Acteocina olivaeformis (Issel, 1869)
 Acteocina orientalis (Lin, 1983)
 Acteocina parviplica (Dall, 1894)
 Acteocina perplicata (Dall, 1889)
 Acteocina protracta (Dautzenberg, 1889)
 Acteocina recta (d’Orbigny, 1841)
 Acteocina sandwicensis (Pease, 1860)
 Acteocina simplex (A. Adams, 1850)
 Acteocina singaporensis (Pilsbry, 1893)
 Acteocina smirna (Dall, 1919)
 Acteocina smithi (Bartsch, 1915)
 Acteocina tohokuensis (Nomura, 1939)
 Acteocina townsendi (Melvill, 1898)
 Acteocina truncatoides (Nomura, 1939)

Species brought into synonymy
 Acteocina agulhasensis (Thiele, 1925): synonym of Cylichnella agulhasensis (Thiele, 1925)
 Acteocina angustior (Baker & Hanna, 1927): synonym of Acteocina infrequens (C. B. Adams, 1852)
 Acteocina bidentata (d'Orbigny, 1841): synonym of Cylichnella bidentata (d’Orbigny, 1841)
 Acteocina biplex (A. Adams, 1850): synonym of Truncacteocina biplex (A. Adams, 1850)
 Acteocina chowanensis Richards, 1947: synonym of Acteocina canaliculata (Say, 1826)
 Acteocina coarctata (A. Adams, 1850): synonym of Truncacteocina coarctata (A. Adams, 1850)
 Acteocina hawaiensis (Pilsbry, 1921): synonym of Truncacteocina hawaiensis (Pilsbry, 1921)
 Acteocina intermedia (Willett, 1928): synonym of Acteocina eximia (Baird, 1863)
 Acteocina magdalenensis (Dall, 1919): synonym of Acteocina infrequens (C. B. Adams, 1852)
 Acteocina matusimana (Nomura, 1939): synonym of Decorifer matusimanus (Nomura, 1939)
 Acteocina minuscula (Turton, 1932): synonym of Cylichnella minuscula (Turton, 1932)
 Acteocina natalensis (Barnard, 1963): synonym of Acteocina fusiformis (A. Adams, 1854)
 Acteocina oryza (Totten, 1835): synonym of Cylichnella oryza (Totten, 1835)
 Acteocina oryzaella (Habe, 1956): synonym of Truncacteocina oryzaella (Habe, 1956)
 Acteocina oyamai (Kuroda & Habe, 1954): synonym of Truncacteocina oyamai (Kuroda & Habe, 1954)
 Acteocina voluta (Quoy & Gaimard, 1833): synonym of Tornatina decorata (Pilsbry, 1904)

References

 Gosliner T.M. (1979) A review of the systematics of Cylichnella Gabb (Opisthobranchia: Scaphandridae). The Nautilus 93(2-3): 85-92
 Vaught, K.C. (1989). A classification of the living Mollusca. American Malacologists: Melbourne, FL (USA). . XII, 195 pp.
 Gofas, S.; Le Renard, J.; Bouchet, P. (2001). Mollusca, in: Costello, M.J. et al. (Ed.) (2001). European register of marine species: a check-list of the marine species in Europe and a bibliography of guides to their identification. Collection Patrimoines Naturels, 50: pp. 180–213

External links
 Serge Gofas, Ángel A. Luque, Joan Daniel Oliver, José Templado & Alberto Serra, 2021 - The Mollusca of Galicia Bank (NE Atlantic Ocean); European Journal of Taxonomy 785: 1–114

Gastropod genera
Acteocinidae